Høyanger is a municipality in Vestland county, Norway. It is located in the traditional district of Sogn. The administrative center is the village of Høyanger. Other villages in Høyanger municipality include Austreim, Bjordal, Kyrkjebø, Lavik, Ortnevik, and Vadheim.

Høyanger is known for having one of the first industrial towns in Norway to use its steep mountains surrounding the town giving excellent conditions for producing hydroelectricity needed for electrolysis. The main product being produced in the village of Høyanger was aluminium.

The  municipality is the 115th largest by area out of the 356 municipalities in Norway. Høyanger is the 203rd most populous municipality in Norway with a population of 3,965.

General information

During the 1960s, there were many municipal mergers across Norway due to the work of the Schei Committee. The municipality of Høyanger was created on 1 January 1964 when the old municipalities of Kyrkjebø and Lavik were merged to form a single municipality.

On 1 January 2020, the Nessane area of neighboring Balestrand Municipality was merged into Høyanger (and the rest of Balestrand was merged into a new, larger Sogndal Municipality). Also on that date, the municipality became part of the newly created Vestland county after Sogn og Fjordane and Hordaland counties were merged.

Name
The name originally belonged to an arm of Sognefjorden (now called the Høyangsfjorden). The first element is høy which means "hay" and the last element is angr which means "fjord". The word høy is probably referring to the green hillsides along the fjord.

Coat of arms
The coat of arms was granted on 15 May 1987. The arms shows three silver flames on a blue background. The flames were chosen as a symbol for the local aluminium industry. Aluminium is melted and purified in the village of Høyanger, due to the cheap hydroelectric energy that is locally available. The colors represent waterpower (blue) and aluminium (silver).

Churches
The Church of Norway has four parishes() within the municipality of Høyanger. It is part of the Sunnfjord prosti (deanery) in the Diocese of Bjørgvin.

Government
All municipalities in Norway, including Høyanger, are responsible for primary education (through 10th grade), outpatient health services, senior citizen services, unemployment and other social services, zoning, economic development, and municipal roads. The municipality is governed by a municipal council of elected representatives, which in turn elect a mayor.  The municipality falls under the Sogn og Fjordane District Court and the Gulating Court of Appeal.

Municipal council
The municipal council  of Høyanger is made up of 21 representatives that are elected to four year terms. The party breakdown of the council is as follows:

Mayor
The mayor  of a municipality in Norway is a representative of the majority party of the municipal council who is elected to lead the council. The mayors of Høyanger (incomplete list):
2011–present: Petter Sortland (Ap)
1996-2011: Kjartan Longva (Ap)

Notable people 

 Johan Austbø (1879 in Ikjefjord – 1945) a teacher, dancer, poet, composer, singer and proponent of Nynorsk.
 Einar Liljedahl (1882 in Kyrkjebø – 1955) a Norwegian military officer
 Per Håland (1919 in Høyanger – 1999) a journalist, newspaper editor and proponent for the Nynorsk language
 Tell Teigen (1923 in Høyanger - 1958) an acrobat who balanced on stacked chairs atop of masts over 35 meters tall
 Einar Kringlen (born 1931 in Høyanger) a Norwegian physician, psychiatrist and academic
 Noralv Teigen (1932 in Høyanger – 2017) actor, theatre instructor and theatre director 
 Einar Førde (1943 in Høyanger – 2004) a journalist, politician and director-general of the Norwegian Broadcasting Corporation (NRK), 1989 to 2001
 Marit Tusvik (born 1951 in Høyanger) a Norwegian author, poet and playwright
 Even Hovland (born 1989 in Vadheim) a professional footballer with almost 300 club caps
 Vegar Gjermundstad (born 1990 in Vadheim) a Norwegian football defender with over 200 club caps

Geography

The Sognefjorden (the largest fjord in Norway) runs through the center of the municipality. Høyanger is bordered to the north by the municipalities of Fjaler and Sunnfjord, to the east by Sogndal and Vik, to the south by Modalen and Masfjorden, and to the west by Gulen and Hyllestad.

Stølsheimen Nature Reserve was created in 1990 in Høyanger. Its  area stretches from high mountaintops through fertile valleys and sweeps over steep meadows down to the fjord. Høyanger is perhaps best known for its mountain farms and lakes.

Economy
Høyanger is a modern industrial community which has grown in pace with the principal employers being Hydro Aluminium and Høyanger Metallverk. Hydroelectricity has played a major role in the development of the area. In addition to manufacturing aluminium, Høyanger supports a varied range of light industry that is backed by retail and service trades. In the rural areas bordering the fjord, farming is the main source of livelihood.  There are currently 115 traditional farms gårds in the municipality. Each traditional farms originally had one owner, but most of them have been divided up and sold off over the years, and so there are more than 115 farms in use today.

Transportation
There are good connections with Oslo and Bergen by bus, as well as air and fast boat services. The village of Lavik is an important junction for traffic to and from Bergen as it is a ferry port that is part of the European route E39 highway. It is part of the Norwegian County Road 55. It is one of the longest tunnels in Europe. Good ferry services across the Sognefjorden link the northern and southern sides of the municipality.

Attractions
In 1986, in Høyanger, Norsk Hydro Aluminium/Høyanger Metallverk opened a museum designed to show what water power has meant both locally and to Norway as a whole. Visitors will get to learn about how the aluminium industry has grown and prospered in the area thanks to the vast energy produced by water.

Near Vadheim is an 18th-century stone bridge called the Ytredal Bridge. It is a popular tourist attraction.

There is also a  narrow gauge funicular railway in the area, first opened in 1953.

References

External links
Municipal fact sheet from Statistics Norway 
Official website: Høyanger Kommune 

 
Municipalities of Vestland
1964 establishments in Norway
600 mm gauge railways